In 2012, the European Shield switched to a new 2 year format with teams playing each other at home and away. The teams involved were the 2010 East and West Champions (Russia and Serbia) who competed along with the 2011 Champions (Germany). They were joined by the 2013 World Cup qualifier (Italy).

Results

Standings

See also

References

External links

2012 in rugby league
2013 in rugby league